The 1932 Open Championship saw professional champion Don Butcher defend his title against amateur champion F. D. Amr Bey of Egypt. The first leg was held at Butcher's home club the Conservative Club on 24 October, and he lost to Bey three games to nil. The second leg was held at the Bath Club on 31 October, the home club of Bey and the match was considerably closer before Bey ran out a three games to two winner.

Results

First Leg

Second Leg

References

Men's British Open Squash Championships
Men's British Open Squash Championship
Men's British Open Squash Championship
Men's British Open Squash Championship
Men's British Open Squash Championship
Squash competitions in London